James Francis (Frank) McAlpine (25 September 1922 – 3 December 2019) was a Canadian entomologist specialising in Diptera.

References

1922 births
2019 deaths
Canadian entomologists